"Rock Awhile" is a song by American singer-songwriter Goree Carter, recorded in April 1949 for the Freedom Recording Company in Houston, Texas. 

The song was released as the 18-year-old Carter's debut single (with "Back Home Blues" as the B-side) shortly after recording. The track is considered by many sources to be the first rock and roll song, and has been called a better candidate than the more commonly cited "Rocket 88", which was released two years later.  The song features an over-driven electric guitar style similar to that of Chuck Berry years later.

The former New York Times pop critic, Robert Palmer, made this comment about the recording in 1995:"The clarion guitar intro differs hardly at all from some of the intros Chuck Berry would unleash on his own records after 1955; the guitar solo crackles through an overdriven amplifier; and the boogie-based rhythm charges right along. The subject matter, too, is appropriate -- the record announces that it's time to 'rock awhile,' and then proceeds to show how it's done."

Personnel
 Goree Carter – vocals, electric guitar
 Lonnie Lyons – piano
 Louis "Nunu" Pitts – bass
 Allison Tucker – drums
 Conrad O. Johnson – alto saxophone
 Sam Williams – tenor saxophone (rhythm)
 Nelson Mills – trumpet (rhythm)

References

External links
  Commentary on the song, SpontaneousLunacy.com

1949 debut singles
1949 songs
Goree Carter songs